Melissa Aigilo is a writer and poet from Papua New Guinea.

Life
Aigilo grew up the eldest of five children and attended St Joseph’s International Primary School, Marianville Girls Catholic High School, and Port Moresby National High School.

She graduated from the University of Papua New Guinea in 2006 with a Bachelor of Arts in Literature degree.

Publications 
Falling foliage, 2004, University of Papua New Guinea
Poems, Kunapipi, 27(2), 2005, University of Wollongong

References

1983 births
Living people
University of Papua New Guinea alumni
Papua New Guinean writers
Papua New Guinean women writers